Kalev Kallo (born on 6 December 1948 Pärnu) is Estonian politician, convicted criminal  and sports person. He is member of XIV Riigikogu. Since 1991 he belongs to Estonian Centre Party.

1995 he was the minister of road and communication of Estonia. He was Deputy Mayor of Tallinn from 1996-1999 and again from 2005–2007.

2000-2008 he was president of Estonian Boxing Association.

He has been member of IX, XI, XII and XIII Riigikogu.

2019 he found guilty related to case of Edgar Savisaar. After that he lost his immunity.

References

1948 births
20th-century Estonian politicians
21st-century Estonian politicians
Estonian Centre Party politicians
Living people
Members of the Riigikogu, 1999–2003
Members of the Riigikogu, 2007–2011
Members of the Riigikogu, 2011–2015
Members of the Riigikogu, 2015–2019
Members of the Riigikogu, 2019–2023
Politicians from Pärnu
Sportspeople from Pärnu
Tallinn University of Technology alumni